Fernando Demaría (born in Buenos Aires, July 19, 1928) is an Argentine poet, philosopher and classical scholar.

Demaría studied at Buenos Aires’ Colegio Champagnat, run by the priests of the Marian Order, whose dedication and rectitude represent a cornerstone in the poet’s life. 
He then graduated in Philosophy at the University of Buenos Aires under the guidance of such humanists as Guillermo Thiele y Carlos Astrada, who made a decisive contribution towards defining his intellectual vocation.

Demaría's urban and academic formation, however, finds an indispensable complement in his deep-rooted contact with the land and the rural environment,  which has afforded him, in his own words,  "the slow and profound teachings of nature", a salient aspect of his poetry and  philosophy.  He believes that  a writer of our time should write few and brief works in order to grant the reader the time to familiarize with the many other authors of value.

Demaría was among the personal friends of Argentine writer and poet Leopoldo Marechal, who dedicated him the Alegropeya of his Heptamerón series.

Under the guidance of  Guillermo Thiele, Demaría published a translation of Heraclitus' Fragments in 1957 for the Universidad Nacional del Litoral. This work was republished in 1972 with the illustrations of Uruguayan artist Lincoln Presno, whose  40 meter memorial monument to John F. Kennedy  in the vast  pampa region near Quemú Quemú, a town founded by the poet's grandparents, was built upon the poet's request.
 
Demaría's study of philosophy led him to the conviction that man's deepest conscience responds to sentiment and feeling rather than to ideas and rationality. His reflections on this aspect of human experience and his own personal quest for clarification resulted in his Treatise on Sentiment or  Tratado del Sentimiento, published in 1970  by the Ediciones del Hombre Nuevo, founded among others by his friend Rafael Squirru.

Among Demaría’s other works: Máximas para la Vida or Maxims for Life, a work in constant re-elaboration.
 
Regarding his poetry, it has been condensed under the common title of  Pampa Roja, elaborated in three stages of his life. The first edition was the result of the visits to La Pampa together with his friend, the painter Perez Celis.
Editorial Dunken published the third and final part in 2007 under the name Tierra de Elegía, or Land of Elegy, a collection of love sonnets. The first two editions of Pampa Roja’s first part  were illustrated by Argentine artist and personal friend Pérez Celis.
At the end of his life, in absence of readers, he compiled his last poems under the title "Pampa de Estrellas" dedicated to "The Invisibles".

References

External links 
 Un Reencuentro con Heráclito https://sites.google.com/site/fernandodemariasonetos/Home/un-reencuentro-con-herclito
 Tierra de Elegía: http://sites.google.com/site/fernandodemariasonetos/Home/Tierra-de-Elegia
 Tratado del Sentimiento: http://sites.google.com/site/fernandodemariasonetos/Home/tratado-del-sentimiento
 Excursions to La Pampa with Perez Celis https://artsandculture.google.com/exhibit/PgISVPW5SLPTJA
 Pampa Roja First edition with wood cuts illustrations by Perez Celis https://artsandculture.google.com/asset/pampa-roja/-QE8GYV9UvDHAg
 Pampa Roja Primera Parte: https://docs.google.com/document/d/1ZlGPSxPA3nr-BVZx9AsfMh5Yg-Q7dqCaWNKZA80YO6k/edit
 Pampa Roja Segunda Parte: https://docs.google.com/document/d/1rLFcN085fQXzBjkHTNzQLDUu7ZBxm7XoqX_aqeIl9D4/edit?usp=drive_web
 Pampa de Estrellas: https://docs.google.com/document/d/1jKFHOffO1NOqTlheN-j9Yy1q2oaxlXQkmi9ewKIAa0g/edit

1928 births
Argentine male poets
Living people
Writers from Buenos Aires